Constantine, Prince of Hohenzollern-Hechingen (Friedrich Wilhelm Konstantin Hermann Thassilo; 16 February 1801 – 3 September 1869), was the last Prince of Hohenzollern-Hechingen. Constantine was the only child of Frederick, Prince of Hohenzollern-Hechingen and his wife, Princess Pauline of Courland, the daughter of the last Duke of Courland, Peter von Biron.

Regency and reign
Constantine served as regent for his ill father, Frederick, beginning in 1834. Upon his father's death in 1838, Constantine became Prince of Hohenzollern-Hechingen and after the death of his mother in 1845, he also inherited the Duchy of Sagan. Following the Revolutions of 1848, Constantine and Charles Anthony, Prince of Hohenzollern-Sigmaringen both agreed to cede their principalities to the Kingdom of Prussia and renounced their rights as sovereign princes and heads of government on 7 December 1849.

Marriages and issue
Constantine married firstly to Princess Eugénie de Beauharnais (1808–1847) on 22 May 1826 in Eichstätt. They had no children.

After her death on September 1847, he married secondly (and morganatically) to Baroness Amalie Schenk von Geyern; upon their marriage, Frederick William IV of Prussia bestowed Amalie with the title Countess of Rothenburg. The couple had three children:
 Countess Friederike Wilhelmine Elisabeth von Rothenburg (1852–1914)
 Count Friedrich Wilhelm Karl von Rothenburg (1856–1912)
 Count Wilhelm Friedrich Louis Gustaf von Rothenburg (1861–1929)

He also sired a daughter out of wedlock with Sophie Scherer:
 Ludovika Sophia (1824–1884)

Death and dynastic end
Constantine died on 3 September 1869 at his estate in Silesia. Because Constantine was the final dynast male member of the Hohenzollern-Hechingen dynastic line, having no legitimate heirs from his two marriages, his title passed to the head of the House of Hohenzollern-Sigmaringen, Charles Anthony, Prince of Hohenzollern.

Honours 
He received the following orders and decorations:

Ancestry

References

Literature 
 Anton-Heinrich Buckenmaier, Michael Hakenmüller: Friedrich-Wilhelm Constantin. Der letzte Fürst. Glückler, Hechingen 2005
 Gustav Schilling: Geschichte des Hauses Hohenzollern, in genealogisch fortlaufenden Biographien aller seiner Regenten von den ältesten bis auf die neuesten Zeiten, nach Urkunden und andern authentischen Quellen, F. Fleischer, 1843, p. 257 ff.

1801 births
1869 deaths
Members of the Prussian House of Lords
House of Hohenzollern-Hechingen
Princes of Hohenzollern-Hechingen
People from Żagań
People from the Province of Silesia